MV Southern Lily is a ship of the Pacific Direct Line, which is a subsidiary of PDL International PTE Ltd, a Singapore-based company.

The Southern Lily operates a regular service carrying containers and hold cargo on the route between New Zealand (Auckland) and Tonga, and Samoa (Apia and Pago Pago). On Tuesday 14 June 2016 the ship help rescue three crewmen from a sailing boat Platino when it started to take on water in a storm.

Container ships
Merchant ships of New Zealand
2007 ships